Barton C. Shaw is an American historian and professor emeritus at Cedar Crest College in Allentown, Pennsylvania.

He graduated from Emory University with a Ph.D.

Awards
 1985 Frederick Jackson Turner Award
 Ford Foundation Fellow
 Fulbright Senior Lecturer in American Studies at the University of Sheffield

Works

   (ACLS History E-Book Project, 2005)

Editor

Anthologies

References

21st-century American historians
21st-century American male writers
Emory University alumni
Cedar Crest College faculty
Living people
Ford Foundation fellowships
Year of birth missing (living people)
American male non-fiction writers